Yileen "Buddy" Gordon (also known as Yilleen Gordon) (born 3 April 1987) is an Australian rugby league footballer who plays for the South Sydney Rabbitohs in the Canterbury Cup NSW. Gordon formerly played for the Canterbury-Bankstown Bulldogs and Penrith Panthers. He was sacked by the West Tigers in February, 2014 for breach of contract. He currently plays in the Centres and has previously played in the back-row or at centre.

Playing career
Yileen Gordon started his career at the South Sydney Rabbitohs in 2005. He made his debut for the South Sydney Rabbitohs against the Canterbury-Bankstown Bulldogs in round 13 of the 2005 NRL season, Gordon spent most of his time when not playing for Souths with the North Sydney Bears Souths feeder side in the Intrust Super Premiership NSW.  Gordon played for Norths in their 2007 Intrust Super Premiership NSW grand final loss to Parramatta where he scored a try in the first half of the match.

Gordon made a total of 31 appearances for Norths and scored 17 tries. In 2008 he signed with the Canterbury-Bankstown Bulldogs, the team he played against in his debut. Gordon signed with the Penrith Panthers for the 2011 season, and his Penrith debut was a 26 - 18 loss against the New Zealand Warriors in round 8.

Gordon played the majority of the 2011 season for the Panthers' NSW Cup feeder club, the Windsor Wolves.

After being released by Penrith, he spent 2012 playing for Moore Park in the South Sydney local league and was working at the National Centre of Indigenous Excellence, where he was part of the healthy lifestyle team and delivered anti-smoking workshops as well as educating Indigenous youth and the wider community on cost effective, healthier meal choices.

In 2013 he was signed to Newtown Jets, the feeder club for the Sydney Roosters, in the NSWRL competition.

In November, 2014 Gordon was signed to a one-year secondary tier contract with the West Tigers, but was sacked by the club before making an appearance. The club refused to reveal the reason behind the sacking, but said the termination of his contract was for "a breach of his playing terms and conditions".

He spent the 2014 season with Thirlmere before joining the Wyong Roos for 2015. Gordon scored two tries in his debut for the Wyong Roos.

Gordon's most significant achievements were representing the Indigenous team in the inaugural Indigenous All Stars Match in 2010 and scoring the winning try in the Indigenous Dreamtime vs. New Zealand Maori game in 2008.

On 16 February 2017, Gordon was announced as one of the squad players for the Mount Pritchard Mounties in the NSW Cup.

In 2018, Gordon joined Intrust Super Premiership NSW side Wentworthville.

At the end of 2018, Gordon was released by Wentworthville.  On 7 March 2019, it was revealed that Gordon had signed with one of his former clubs South Sydney and played for the Souths reserve grade side during the 2019 season.

References

External links
Mount Pritchard Mounties profile

1987 births
Living people
Australian rugby league players
Australian Aboriginal rugby league team players
Penrith Panthers players
Canterbury-Bankstown Bulldogs players
South Sydney Rabbitohs players
Indigenous Australian rugby league players
Indigenous All Stars players
North Sydney Bears NSW Cup players
Newcastle Yowies players
Rugby league second-rows
Rugby league locks
Rugby league players from Sydney
Wentworthville Magpies players
Windsor Wolves players
Wyong Roos players